Jean-Pierre Mbereke-Baban (born 5 November 1959) is a Cameroonian boxer. He competed at the 1980 Summer Olympics and the 1984 Summer Olympics. At the 1980 Summer Olympics, he lost to Luis Pizarro of Puerto Rico.

References

1959 births
Living people
Cameroonian male boxers
Olympic boxers of Cameroon
Boxers at the 1980 Summer Olympics
Boxers at the 1984 Summer Olympics
Place of birth missing (living people)
Featherweight boxers
20th-century Cameroonian people